Martial is a crater on Mercury. It has a diameter of 51 kilometers. Its name was adopted by the International Astronomical Union in 1979. Martial is named for the ancient Roman poet Martial, who lived from 40 to 103.

References

Impact craters on Mercury